The 1992 Fort Lauderdale Strikers season was the third season of the team in the American Professional Soccer League.  It was the club's twenty-sixth season in professional soccer.  This year, the team finished in fourth place in the regular season.  They went to the playoffs as a semifinalist.

Background

Review

Competitions

APSL regular season

Results summaries

Results by round

Match reports

APSL Playoffs

Semifinals

Bracket

Professional Cup

Statistics

References 

1992
Fort Lauderdale Strikers
Fort Lauderdale Strikers